Hawak Ko Buhay Mo  is a 1996 Philippine action film written and directed by Ronnie Ricketts under the name Ronn Rick. The film stars Ricketts and Michael de Mesa.

The film is streaming online on YouTube.

Cast
 Ronnie Ricketts as Alex
 Michelle Aldana as Joana
 Michael de Mesa as Bakli Leeg
 Efren Reyes Jr. as Matt
 Jessa Zaragoza as Victim
 Rolly Quizon as Skillet
 Ernie Garcia as Victor
 Rez Cortez as Chief
 Edgar Mande as Matt's Policeman
 Jude Estrada
 Renzo Cruz
 Ben Sanchez as Bartender
 Nognog as Jeff
 Dinky Doo Jr. as Mack
 Jayke Joson as Alex's Policeman
 Mikey Arroyo as Alex's Policeman
 Alvin Anson as Alex's Asset
 Dong Serrano
 Onchie Dela Cruz
 Javier Vega
 Topher Ricketts as Alex's Policeman
 Elmo Rodrigo
 Jake Ricketts as Alex's Policeman
 Ver Rodriguez
 Paul Sanz

References

External links

Full Movie on Viva Films

1996 films
1996 action films
Filipino-language films
Philippine action films
Neo Films films